Holy Fire is a 1996 science fiction novel by American writer Bruce Sterling. It was nominated for the British Science Fiction Award in 1996, and for both the Hugo and Locus Awards in 1997.

Holy Fire is the story of an old woman who has gained a second youth—in a world in which radical life extension is available through highly intrusive technological means—and who has an ontological transformation as a result.

References

External links

 Holy Fire at Worlds Without End

Biopunk novels
1996 American novels
1996 science fiction novels
Novels by Bruce Sterling